Year 288 (CCLXXXVIII) was a leap year starting on Sunday (link will display the full calendar) of the Julian calendar. In the Roman Empire, it was known as the Year of the Consulship of Maximian and Ianuarianus (or, less frequently, year 1041 Ab urbe condita). The denomination 288 for this year has been used since the early medieval period, when the Anno Domini calendar era became the prevalent method in Europe for naming years.

Events 
 By place 
 Roman Empire 
 Emperor Diocletian launches a campaign into Germanic territory from the province of Raetia (Switzerland).
 Around this time, an army loyal to Maximian, probably led by the future emperor Constantius, defeats the usurper Carausius or his Frankish allies in northern Gaul. In this or the following year, Carausius withdraws his military forces and administrative presence from Gaul, confining himself to Roman Britain.
 Maximian makes an alliance with the Frankish king Gennobaudes.
 Far from Carausius' fleet, in the rivers of Gaul, Maximian builds a fleet to contest control of the North Sea and re-take Britain.
 Around this time, Constantius marries Maximian's stepdaughter, Theodora, and it may also be around this time that the general Galerius marries Diocletian's daughter Galeria Valeria.

Births 
 Li Ban, Chinese emperor of Cheng Han (d. 334)
 Wen Jiao (or Taizhen), Chinese politician (d. 329)

Deaths 
 Maximilian of Lorch, Christian missionary and martyr
 Sebastian, Roman soldier and Christian martyr
 Teng Xiu, Chinese general and governor

References